Candle Corporation was an American software company active from 1976 to 2004. The company spent the first two decades developing system monitoring applications for a variety of IBM mainframes and their corresponding software, their first being OMEGAMON which saw quick widespread adoption in commercial enterprises. In the mid-1990s, the company made pivots toward non-mainframe monitoring software and middleware. IBM acquired the company for between $350 million and $600 million in 2004.

History

1970s – 1980s
Aubrey G. Chernick (born 1949 in Los Angeles, California), the founder of Candle, grew up in Deloraine, Manitoba, after his family moved there from California. After graduating from the University of Manitoba with a Bachelor of Science in chemistry, he landed a job at the university's environmental protection laboratory, performing analyses of the Red River of the North. The minicomputers at the lab were Chernick's first hands-on experience with computers; with a fellow employee, he learned how to program in BASIC. Following this, Chernick deviated from his original career path of medicine to work as a software developer for Computer Science Corporation (CSC)'s Canadian subsidiary in Ontario. After getting laid off from CSC after three months, he worked as a programmer for Laurentian University, working on IBM's System/360 Model 40 mainframe, and for the Government of Manitoba, where he learned how to operate and code for IBM's MFT and MVS operating systems. These jobs provided Chernick his first experiences with mainframes.

While attending meetings hosted by in Ontario SHARE—a users' group for IBM mainframe personnel—Chernick observed recurring complaints from attendees, who spoke of not being able to satisfy common needs with IBM's operating systems. In 1975, Chernick convinced Canada Life's Ontario branch to let him use their mainframes as a development platform for an application that monitored system performance, in exchange for a bargain license for the final product. The finished software, which he named OMEGAMON/MVS, took roughly five months to develop. Immediately afterward, Chernick established Candle Services Corporation from his apartment in Toronto in Octoberr 1976 and began selling OMEGAMON door-to-door to various businesses (one such being Datacrown, where he unsuccessfully vyed for employment). He named the company Candle both to convey enlightenment and warmth and to avoid the glut of tech-jargon-heavy names. In 1977, Chernick moved the company to West Los Angeles and abbreviated the company name to Candle Corporation. In California, he gained clients such as Southern California Edison, Northrop, Hughes Aircraft, TRW, and Warner Bros.

Candle employed 52 people in 1980 and logged $4.5 million in revenue for that year; in December alone the company recorded sales of $1 million. In January 1981, the company released OMEGAMON/CICS, a performance monitor oriented toward the financial sector and their transaction processing systems. In September 1982, Candle released MVS, targeting system administrators. Candle's sales in 1981 totaled $10.4 million, while employment grew to 108. That same year, the company established a philanthropic medical and health foundation, the Candle Foundation.

The company reached revenues of $100 million in 1988, a year after acquiring Chicago-based Netserv, Inc. By the end of the next year, Candle employed roughly 700 people. Candle was second in market share in the field of performance measurement software, according to Software Magazine, cornering 32 percent of the market. They were narrowly defeated by IBM (33 percent); third place was Boole & Babbage (13 percent). In 1988, the company released AF/OPERATOR, one of the first console automation software packages, and AF/REMOTE an automation management utility. Shortly after the company released OMEGAMON for DB/2 relational databases, which saw quick widespread adoption. In June 1989, the company announced OMEGACENTER, an integrated performance management and automation software package for data centers and large companies running local IBM mainframes. OMEGACENTER was one of the first performance measuring applications with a graphical user interface, via the Status Monitor tool.

1990s – 2000s
In summer 1990, Candle released OMEGAMON II, which integrated several of the company's existing applications and built on the graphical user interface of Status Monitor to these integrated functions. In 1991, the company unveiled three more software utilities, including a pair for DB/2 and the OMEGAVIEW status management utility. By the end of 1990, the company reached $151.4 million in sales. In 1991, they were named the 20th largest software company in Software Magazine. In late 1992, Candle moved its headquarters to a 150,000-square-foot building in the Water Garden area of Santa Monica, in the biggest office lease within Los Angeles County in 1992. It also opened a data center of its own, in the outskirts of Los Angeles. In 1993, Candle introduced OMEGACENTER for VMS and OMEGAMON II for SMS. Candle logged $210 million in sales that year; the following year, the company collected revenues of $213 million.

In 1995, the company released Candle Command Center (CCC), a suite of network and systems management software for servers running AIX and MVS and PC-compatible workstations running OS/2. With the release of CCC, Candle began pivoting away from mainframe software, the company simultaneously launching a $500 million research and development initiative to reinforce this pivot. The company also placed its first advertisement in a trade publication to communicate this move.

In 1996, Candle made yet another pivot toward developing middleware for networked computers. To this end, Candle acquired several companies: CleverSoft, Inc., a provider of management tools for servers running Lotus Notes based in Scarborough, Maine; AMSYS North America, a service provider for MQSeries based in Mendon, Massachusetts; PowerQ Software Corporation, a maker of MQSeries software development and testing environments; and Apertus Technologies' MQView for distributed MQSeries installations. Employment in Candle reached 1,200 in 1996, approximately 550 of which working in the company's 29 branch offices. During this time, the company's mainframe software and middleware were used in roughly 5,000 mainframes, and it counted 75 percent of the Fortune 500 among its clientele.

Candle relocated its headquarters again in 1999, moving about 700 employees from Santa Monica to a four-story 335,000-square-foot building in El Segundo—a building once occupied by Rockwell International for the assembly of B-1 Lancers. In the same year, the company shifted its focus to e-commerce and launched eBA*ServiceMonitor, a comprehensive monitoring application for online businesses. By the end of the millennium, Candle reached $382 million in revenue and employed 1,800 people total.

The company reached the 2,000 employee mark in 2000, the same year sales reached $400 million. In the next year, the company released OMEGAMON XE and DE, configurations of their flagship product centered on e-businesses, and a software-as-a-service platform, CandleNet eBusiness Platform, which facilitated the deployment of e-commerce services. The split between mainframe and non-mainframe pursuits within the company was 60-to-40 by this point. In 2002, the company released PathWAI, a line of software packages and consulting services for streamlining the process of designing and developing middleware and web server back-ends. Candle reached $207 million in revenue in 2002 and $328 million in sales in 2003.

IBM acquired Candle Corporation in April 2004 for an undisclosed sum. The deal was reportedly worth between $350 million and $600 million. After the acquisition, IBM absorbed Candle's assets into their Tivoli Software division.

References

IBM acquisitions
1976 establishments in Ontario
1977 disestablishments in Ontario
1977 establishments in California
2004 disestablishments in California
American companies established in 1976
American companies disestablished in 2004
Canadian companies established in 1976
Canadian companies disestablished in 1977
Defunct software companies of Canada
Defunct software companies of the United States
Software companies established in 1976
Software companies disestablished in 2004
Middleware